Maria Tranchina (born 10 February 1968) is a former Italian female shot putter and hammer thrower, later became masters athlete. She won two gold medals at the 2007 World Masters Championships held in Riccione.

Biography
She has won three national championships at senior level. Her personal best 17.04 m, set in 1995, ranked in the top 60 on the IAAF indoor world lists at the end of the season.

Achievements
Masters

Personal bests
 Shot put: 17.04 m ( Schio, 16 February 1995)
 Hammer throw: 61.41 m ( Formia, 17 May 1998)

National titles
 Italian Athletics Championships
 shot put: 1995
 hammer throw: 1997
 Italian Winter Throwing Championships
 hammer throw: 1996

See also
Italian all-time lists – shot put

References

External links
 
 Maria Tranchina at Masters Athletics

1972 births
Living people
Italian female shot putters
Italian female hammer throwers
Sportspeople from Palermo
Italian masters athletes
20th-century Italian women
21st-century Italian women